Space logistics is "the theory and practice of driving space system design for operability and supportability, and of managing the flow of materiel, services, and information needed throughout a space system lifecycle." It includes terrestrial logistics in support of space travel, including any additional "design and development, acquisition, storage, movement, distribution, maintenance, evacuation, and disposition of space materiel", movement of people in space (both routine and for medical and other emergencies), and contracting and supplying any required support services for maintaining space travel. The space logistics research and practice primarily focus on the modeling and management of the astro-logistics supply chain from Earth and on to destinations throughout the solar system as well as the system architecture strategies to minimize both logistics requirements and operational costs of human and robotic operations in space.

History 
As early as 1960, Wernher von Braun spoke of the necessity and the underdevelopment of space logistics:
We have a logistics problem coming up in space ... that will challenge the thinking of the most visionary logistics engineers. As you know, we are currently investigating three regions of space: near-Earth, the lunar region, and the planets. While it is safe to say that all of us have undoubtedly been aware of many or most of the logistics requirements and problems in the discussion, at least in a general way, I think it is also safe to state that many of us have not realized the enormous scope of the tasks performed in the logistics area. I hope the discussions bring about a better understanding of the fact that logistics support is a major portion of most large development projects. Logistics support, in fact, is a major cause of the success or failure of many undertakings.

By 2004, with NASA beginning a governmental initiative to explore the Moon, Mars, and beyond, a number of deficiencies in both capacity and capability to support logistics needs even in low Earth orbit had been identified.

By 2005, analysts recognized the coming opportunity for the national governments involved with the Space Shuttle program to reduce costs by acquiring cargo transportation logistics services commercially following completion of the construction phase of the International Space Station, then expected by 2010.

Activities after 2005 
According to Manufacturing Business Technology,
NASA has awarded $3.8 million to two MIT engineering professors to pursue an interdisciplinary study for adapting supply chain logistics to support interplanetary material transport and transfer. Professors David Simchi-Levi and Olivier de Weck of the MIT Engineering Systems Division will spearhead the project in partnership with the Jet Propulsion Laboratory, Payload Systems, and United Space Alliance.
Sustainable space exploration is impossible without appropriate supply chain management and unlike Apollo, future exploration will have to rely on a complex supply network on the ground and in space. The primary goal of this project is to develop a comprehensive supply chain management framework and planning tool for space logistics. The eventual integrated space logistics framework will encompass terrestrial movement of material and information, transfer to launch sites, integration of payload onto launch vehicles and launch to Low Earth Orbit, in-space and planetary transfer, and planetary surface logistics. The MIT-led interplanetary supply chain management model will take a four-phase development approach:
1. Review of supply chain management lessons learned from Earth-based commercial and military projects, including naval submarine and arctic logistics
2. Space logistics network analyses based on modeling Earth-Moon-Mars orbits and expected landing-exploration sites
3. Demand/supply modeling that embraces uncertainty in demand, cargo mix, costs, and supply chain disruptions
4. Development of an interplanetary supply chain architecture.

Examples of supply classes

Among the supply classes identified by the MIT Space Logistics Center:
Propellants and Fuels
Crew Provisions and Operations
Maintenance and Upkeep
Stowage and Restraint
Waste and Disposal
Habitation and Infrastructure
Transportation and Carriers
Miscellaneous

In the category of space transportation for ISS Support, one might list:
Space Shuttle (now retired)
Progress spacecraft, Russian expendable unmanned resupply spacecraft
Automated Transfer Vehicle, expendable unmanned resupply spacecraft developed by the European Space Agency
H-II Transfer Vehicle (HTV) expendable unmanned resupply spacecraft developed by the Japan Aerospace Exploration Agency (JAXA)
Dragon spacecraft, reusable cargo carrier developed by SpaceX

Tianzhou (spacecraft) is the only expendable unmanned resupply spacecraft to Chinese Space Station.

State of the ISS logistics capability in 2005
A snapshot of the logistics of a single space facility, the International Space Station, was provided in 2005 via a comprehensive study done by James Baker and Frank Eichstadt. This article section makes extensive reference to that study.

ISS cargo requirements
, the United States Space Shuttle, the Russian Progress, and to a very limited extent, the Russian Soyuz vehicles were the only space transport systems capable of transporting ISS cargo.

However, in 2004, it was already anticipated that the European Automated Transfer Vehicle (ATV) and Japanese H-IIA Transfer Vehicle (HTV) would be introduced into service before the end of ISS Assembly. As of 2004, the US Shuttle transported the majority of the pressurized and unpressurized cargo and provides virtually all of the recoverable down mass capability (the capability of non-destructive reentry of cargo).

Cargo vehicle capabilities
Baker and Eichstadt also wrote, in 2005:
An understanding of the future ISS cargo requirements is necessary to size a commercial cargo vehicle designed to replace the Shuttle's capabilities and capacities and augment currently planned alternative vehicles. Accurate estimates of ISS cargo transfer requirements are difficult to establish due to ongoing changes in logistics requirements, crew tending levels, vehicle availabilities, and the evolving role the ISS will play in NASA's space exploration and research goals.
An increased unpressurized cargo delivery requirement is shown during the years 2007–2010. This increased rate is a result of a current plan to preposition unpressurized spares on the ISS prior to Shuttle retirement. Provision of a commercial cargo carrier capable of transporting unpressurized spares to supplement the Shuttle eliminates the prepositioning requirement and aligns the estimated averages during 2007–2010 to approximately 24,000 kg for pressurized cargo and 6800 kg for unpressurized cargo. Considering the delivery capability of the remaining systems after the Shuttle is retired yields.
Retirement of the Shuttle and reliance on the Progress, ATV, and HTV for ISS logistics will result in no significant recoverable down-mass capability. Further, no evidence suggests that any of these cargo transport systems can increase production and launch rates to cover the cargo delivery deficiency.

Commercial opportunity
Baker and Eichstadt also wrote, in 2005:
In addition to ISS support deficiencies, alternative opportunities for a commercial cargo transport system exist. The retirement of the Shuttle will also result in an inability to conduct Low Earth Orbit (LEO) research independent of the ISS. A commercial payload service could serve as a free-flying research platform to fulfill this need. As logistics support requirements for NASA's space exploration initiative emerge, existing commercial system can be employed.

Finally, nascent interest in the development of non-government commercial space stations must take resupply issues into consideration. Such considerations will undoubtedly be subjected to a make/buy analysis. Existing systems which have amortized their development costs across multiple government and non-government programs should favor a "buy" decision by commercial space station operators. As these markets arise, commercial companies will be in a position to provide logistics services at a fraction of the cost of government-developed systems. The resulting economies of scale will benefit both markets. This conclusion was reached by a Price-Waterhouse study chartered by NASA in 1991. The study concluded that the value of SPACEHAB's flight-asset-based commercial module service with an estimated net-present-value of $160 million would have cost the US government over $1 billion to develop and operate using standard cost plus contracting. SPACEHAB's commercial operations and developments (such as the Integrated Cargo Carrier) since 1991 represent further cost savings over government-owned and operated systems.

Commercial companies are more likely to efficiently invest private capital in service enhancements, assured continued availability, and enhanced service capability. This tendency, commonplace in non-aerospace applications, has been demonstrated by SPACEHAB in the commercial space systems market via continued module enhancements and introduction of new logistics carriers.

Shortfalls in ISS cargo transport capacity, emerging opportunities, and experience gained from SPACEHAB's existing ground and flight operations have encouraged development of Commercial Payload Service (CPS). As a commercially developed system, SPACEHAB recognizes that to optimize its capability and affordability requires that certain approaches in system development and operations be taken.

The first approach levies moderate requirements on the system. Introducing fundamental capabilities on the front end and scarring for enhanced capabilities later reduces cost to launch and shortens development time.

The second one is the utilization of existing technology and capabilities, where appropriate. A typical feature of NASA programs is the continual reach for newly developed technologies. While attractive from a technical advancement perspective, this quest is expensive and often fails to create operational capabilities. A commercially developed cargo module will maximize the use of existing technologies (off the shelf where possible) and seek technical advances only where system requirements or market conditions drive the need for such advances. Additionally, costs associated with the development of spacecraft are not limited to those associated with the vehicle systems. Significant costs associated with the infrastructure must also be considered. SPACEHAB's existing logistics and vehicle processing facilities co-located with the Eastern launch range and at the Sea Launch facilities enable avoidance of significant system development costs.

Finally, SPACEHAB has realized cost and schedule reductions by employing commercial processes instead of Government processes. As a result, SPACEHAB's mission integration template for a Shuttle-based carrier is 14 months, compared to 22 months for a similar Shuttle-based Multi-Purpose Logistics Module (MPLM).

Rack transfer capability
Baker and Eichstadt also wrote, in 2005:
The ISS utilizes the International Standard Payload Rack (ISPR) as the primary payload and experiment accommodations structure in all US operated modules. Transferring ISPRs onto and off the ISS requires passage through the hatch only found at the Common Berthing Mechanism (CBM) berthing locations. The diameter of the CBM combined with ISPR proportions typically drives cargo vehicle diameters to sizes only accommodated by 5 m payload fairings launched on Evolved Expendable Launch Vehicles (EELV).

Recoverable reentry–pressurized payloads
Baker and Eichstadt also wrote, in 2005:
The Russian Progress vehicle has long served as a cargo vehicle which, upon departing a space station, destructively reenters the atmosphere destroying all "cargo" on board. This approach works very effectively for removing unwanted mass from a space station. However, NASA has indicated that the return of payloads from the ISS is highly desirable [5]. Therefore, a commercial system must examine the implications of including a pressurized payload return capability either in the initial design or as an enhanced feature of the service to be introduced in the future. Providing such capability requires the incorporation of thermal protection subsystem, deorbit targeting subsystems, landing recovery subsystems, ground recovery infrastructure, and FAA licensure. The recovery of unpressurized payloads presents unique challenges associated with the exposed nature of unpressurized carriers. To implement a recoverable reentry system for unpressurized payloads requires the development of an encapsulation system. Encapsulation activities must either occur autonomously prior to reentry or as a part of the operations associated with loading the unpressurized cargo carrier with return cargo. In either case, additional cost associated with spacecraft systems or increased operational requirements will be higher than simply loading and departing a pressurized carrier for a destructive reentry.

Mixed manifest capability
Baker and Eichstadt also wrote, in 2005:
Typically, the avoidance of point solutions provides flexibility for a given system to provide variable capabilities. Designing a cargo carrier that mixes pressurized and unpressurized systems can lead to increased cost if all associated cargo accommodations must be flown on every flight. To avoid unnecessary costs associated with designing and flying structure that accommodates fixed relative capacities of all types of payloads, a modular approach is taken for CPS. Anticipated cargo transport requirements for ISS after the Shuttle is retired indicate that dedicated pressurized and unpressurized missions can support the ISS up-mass requirements. Utilizing common base features (i.e. service module, docking system, etc.) and modularizing the pressurized and unpressurized carrier elements of the spacecraft assures flexibility while avoiding point solutions.

Propellant transfer
Baker and Eichstadt also wrote, in 2005:
The Russian Segment of the ISS (RSOS) has the capability via the probe and cone docking mechanisms to support propellant transfer. Incorporation of propellant transfer capability introduces international issues requiring the coordination of multiple corporate and governmental organizations. Since ISS propellant requirements are adequately provided for by the Russian Progress and ESA ATV, costs associated with incorporating these features can be avoided. However, the CPS' modular nature coupled with the inherent capability of selected subsystems enables economical alternatives to propellant transfer should ISS needs require.

Indirect costs considered in developing the CPS architecture include licensing requirements associated with International Traffic in Arms Regulations (ITAR) and the Federal Aviation Administration (FAA) commercial launch and entry licensing requirements. ITAR licensing drives careful selection of the vehicle subsystem suppliers. Any utilization or manufacturing of spacecraft subsystems by non-US entities can only be implemented once the appropriate Department of State and/or Commerce approvals are in place. FAA licensing requirements necessitate careful selection of the launch and landing sites. Vehicles developed by a US organized corporation, even if launched in another country, require review of the vehicle system, operations, and safety program by the FAA to ensure that risks to people and property are within acceptable limits

Downmass
While significant focus of space logistics is on upmass, or payload mass carried up to orbit from Earth, space station operations also have significant downmass requirements. 
Returning cargo from low Earth orbit to Earth is known as transporting downmass, the total logistics payload mass that is returned from space to the surface of the Earth for subsequent use or analysis.
Downmass logistics are important aspects of research and manufacturing work that occurs in orbital space facilities.  In the 2020s, the term began to also be used in the context of mass movement to and from other planetary bodies.  For example, "the upmass and downmass capacity [of the SpaceX Starship HLS lunar lander]  far exceeded NASA’s requirements"

For the International Space Station, there have been periods of time when downmass capability was severely restricted.  For example, for approximately ten months from the time of the retirement of the Space Shuttle following the STS-135 mission in July 2011—and the resultant loss of the Space Shuttle's ability to return payload mass—an increasing concern became returning downmass cargo from low Earth orbit to Earth for subsequent use or analysis.
During this period of time, of the four space vehicles capable of reaching and delivering cargo to the International Space Station, only the Russian Soyuz vehicle could return even a very small cargo payload to Earth. The Soyuz cargo downmass capability was limited as the entire space capsule was filled to capacity with the three ISS crew members who return on each Soyuz return.  At the time none of the remaining cargo resupply vehicles — the Russian Space Agency Progress, the European Space Agency (ESA) ATV, the Japan Aerospace Exploration Agency (JAXA) HTV — could return any downmass cargo for terrestrial use or examination.

A return capsule tested in 2018 called the HTV Small Re-entry Capsule (HSRC) could be used in future HTV flights.

See also

 Autonomous logistics
 CSTS Crew Space Transportation System

References

External links
 Space Logistics MIT project

Logistics
Space technology
Spaceflight